The Apple Cup is an American college football rivalry game between the University of Washington Huskies and Washington State University Cougars, the two largest universities in the state of Washington. Both are members of the North Division of the 

First played in 1900, the matchup is traditionally the final game of the regular season for both teams and generally took place on the Saturday preceding Thanksgiving. With the NCAA's extension of the regular season to twelve games in 2006, the game is often played at a later date. Since 2011, it has most commonly been held on the Friday after Thanksgiving.

Since 1946, the game has been held in odd years in Seattle at Husky Stadium (except 2011, at CenturyLink Field), while Washington State has hosted during even years at Rogers Field (1946, 1948, 1954) and Martin Stadium (since 1982) in Pullman, and Joe Albi Stadium in Spokane. The games in eastern Washington from 1935 to 1948, all in Pullman, were held in mid-October. The exception was in 1945, when two games were played: the first in Seattle in mid-October, and the second in Pullman in late 

First awarded in 1963, the Apple Cup Trophy is presented to the winner by the state's governor at the conclusion of the game.

Series history

The teams played for the Governor's Trophy starting in 1934. This bronze shield was made by sculptor Dudley Pratt and donated and awarded by Governor Clarence D. Martin, an alumnus of the University of Washington and the namesake of Pullman's Martin Stadium. The winners for the years 1934–1939 are etched on the shield. The trophy was awarded until at least 1946.

In 1963 the Big Apple Trophy was donated to the competition by the Washington Apple Commission, emblematic of Washington's national reputation as a major producer  This award was colloquially referred to as the Apple Cup, which later came to metonymically refer to the game itself. In 1989 the apple was recognized as Washington's state fruit during the state's centennial celebration.

When the college football regular season was lengthened from eleven to twelve games in 2006, there was a movement to change the date of the game from the Saturday before Thanksgiving to the weekend following, which would have allowed a bye week for both teams during the season. In 2006, both teams played twelve straight weeks without a bye, leaving the two teams noticeably fatigued. The 2007 game was played on the Saturday after Thanksgiving for the first time; but the 2008 game was returned to the Saturday before 

The media joked that the 2008 game won by the Cougars in Pullman was the "Crapple Cup" and "full of worms," because  hosted winless  The game returned to the Saturday after Thanksgiving in 2009 in Seattle. The 2011 game in Seattle was moved to CenturyLink Field to allow an early start on the renovation of 

From 1950 through 1980 (except for  the WSU home games in the series were played in Spokane at Joe Albi Stadium (Memorial Stadium until 1962). The Cougars won three of these fifteen  games (1958, 1968, 1972). In 1910, the WSU home game in Spokane was played at Recreation Park 

The first game in 1900 resulted in a 5–5 tie. The series has been played continuously since 1945, when there were two games, one in Seattle and one in Pullman. The 2020 game was cancelled due to the COVID-19 pandemic.

Game results

Overtime was introduced for Division I-A (FBS) in 1996 and has been used four times in the Apple Cup, all in Pullman.Each team has two overtime victories: UW in 1996 and 2002, WSU in 2008 and 2012.
OT → Overtime (1996, 2012)
2OT → Double Overtime (2008)
3OT → Triple Overtime (2002)
After a two-year hiatus in 1943 and 1944, two games were played in 1945.The 2020 game scheduled in Pullman was declared No Contest by the league due to Washington State not having the minimum number of scholarship players available for the game as a result of a positive football student-athlete COVID-19 cases.   Prior to 1959, WSU was WSC.

Coaching records since 1945

Washington

Washington State

 Last tie was in 1942, overtime began in 1996 in Division I-A
 Two games were played in 1945
 Jimmy Lake (UW) and Nick Rolovich (WSU) both coached for the 2020 and 2021 seasons, but neither in an Apple Cup; the 2020 game was canceled amid the COVID-19 pandemic, and both were fired prior to the 2021 matchup.

See also 
 List of NCAA college football rivalry games
 List of most-played college football series in NCAA Division I
 Washington–Washington State men's basketball rivalry

References

College football rivalries in the United States
College football rivalry trophies in the United States
Washington Huskies football
Washington State Cougars football